Middle New Cornwall  is a community  in the Canadian province of Nova Scotia, located in the Lunenburg Municipal District in Lunenburg County.

While it is a small community, it has many lakes that served and still serve as great use for saw mills. 
In 1883, six saw mills were in use in Cornwall, but today only one remains.

Of all the lakes that you find Cornwall, Big Mush-a-Mush is the largest and most populated. Although throughout the 1800s the lake was often labeled on maps as Great Mush-a-Mush Lake.

References
Middle New Cornwall on Destination Nova Scotia

Communities in Lunenburg County, Nova Scotia
General Service Areas in Nova Scotia